Brigadier General John Adam Tytler VC CB (29 October 1825 – 14 February 1880) was a recipient of the Victoria Cross, the highest and most prestigious award for gallantry in the face of the enemy that can be awarded to British and Commonwealth forces.

Details
He was born in Munger, the son of John Tytler, an East India Company surgeon.

Tytler was 32 years old, and a lieutenant in the 66th Bengal Native Infantry, Bengal Army, (later 1st Gurkha Rifles) during the Indian Rebellion of 1857 when the following deed took place on 10 February 1858 at Choorpoorah, India for which he was awarded the VC:

Further information
He later served in the Umbeyla Campaign and retired with the rank of brigadier general. His Victoria Cross is displayed at The Gurkha Museum in Winchester, Hampshire, England.

Notes

See also
List of Brigade of Gurkhas recipients of the Victoria Cross

References
Monuments to Courage (David Harvey, 1999)
The Register of the Victoria Cross (This England, 1997)

External links 
 

1825 births
1880 deaths
British recipients of the Victoria Cross
British Indian Army generals
British East India Company Army officers
Companions of the Order of the Bath
Indian Rebellion of 1857 recipients of the Victoria Cross
British military personnel of the Umbeyla Campaign
Indian Staff Corps officers